Clovis East High School is a four-year public high school of Clovis Unified School District located in Clovis, California, United States. It is home to the Timberwolves. It was built in 2000, but first welcomed students in 1999, sharing a campus with Reyburn Intermediate School.

It was named a California Distinguished School in 2007, and was named a Blue Ribbon School in 2008.

Athletics
The boys' Clovis East track and field team won the 2009 CIF State Championship.

Girls badminton won Valley championship for the 2017, 2019, and many more

Notable alumni
 Chris Colfer, singer, actor, and author
 Bryson DeChambeau, professional golfer, PGA Tour
 Derek Ernst, professional golfer, PGA Tour

References

External links
CEHS Official website

High schools in Fresno County, California
Clovis, California
Public high schools in California
1999 establishments in California